Richard A. Scott (born February 19, 1964) is an ex-Alaskan freelance comic book artist, writer, videographer and voice talent.

Biography

Scott currently embellishes for AC Comics FemForce having just contributed to FemForce's 150th issue (Aug 2009). Other contributions include DC Comics / TSR, INC, Avatar #1 (1990) as an assistant inker.  He also was a regular contributor to the second incarnation of the legendary Science Fiction Review (1990–91) helmed by Elton Elliot. Contributing much spot art for much of the run along with his very good friend Randy Lee Prinslow.

He also writes for TwoMorrows Publications Back Issue! edited by Michael Eury. Issue #25 covered the Museum of Comic and Cartoon Art art gallery, #30 Gary Owens, #39 Fred Hembeck.  Scott also has done an article for issue #54 of The Jack Kirby Collector edited by John Morrow, about Fantastic Four the Lost Adventure.  He has also covered Megan Rose Gedris for Curve. Here he started doing collaborative jam pieces of art with the artists he has interviewed (providing a unique spin with his interviews.) The Gedris art is currently seen on his website. His Fred Hembeck article for Back Issue! #39 will feature one of these jams.

Scott did research work and took photos for Robert James Parish's Gus Van Sant, Unauthorized Biography. He assisted his long-time friend Andy Mangels on Animation on DVD-the ultimate guide and his upcoming book for TwoMorrows Lou Scheimer: Creating The Filmation Generation. He was also involved with Andy's The Perez Archives for The Comic Book Legal Defense Fund (getting to help select images and provide the color guide for the book). He also assists him with the yearly bi-coastal, charitable Wonder Woman day event.

Scott has appeared in Woodcrest Productions Michael Golden The Creator Chronicles DVD and has been involved with the soon to be released Joe Sinnott The Creator Chronicles DVD. He also has filmed for the upcoming Matt Wagner production as well.
He-Man and the Masters of the Universe: Season one, Volume two boxed DVD set, Disk #6 He-Man Invades the San Diego Comic-Con Richard is interviewed in the middle of the San Diego Comic-con for the DVD  as well as being a P.A. (uncredited on DVD).
And if you look real hard you might see him in TNT's Leverage Season #2 Episode 7 "The Two Live Crew Job" (2009).

He also uses the aliases of 'Spunky (cheese)' and 'Chameleon King' patterned off his favorite Legionnaire Chameleon Boy in the Legion of Super-Heroes.

Bibliography
Comics work includes:
 FemForce, (AC Comics, Apr 2009–Present)
 Avatar, (DC Comics, May 2008–Present)
Writing work includes:
 Back Issue!, The Jack Kirby Collector, Draw (Twomorrows, 2006-Current)
Curve magazine (Sept 2008-?)
 Gus Van Sant, Unauthorized Biography (Da Capo Press, October 2001)
 Animation on DVD-the ultimate guide (Stone Bridge Press, March 2003)
Video work includes:
 Michael Golden The Creator Chronicles (Woodcrest Productions 2008–present)
 He-Man and the Masters of the Universe (BCI Eclipse Fall 2005-2007)
 TNT'S Leverage (TNT Aug 2009)

References

External links

Facebook website
Richard A. Scott at Comic space

American illustrators
Living people
Artists from Alaska
Writers from Anchorage, Alaska
1964 births